Sulien was an 11th-century Bishop of St David's, for two periods (1073-1078 and 1079/80-1085/6). He died about 1090/1.

Sulien is closely associated with the clas church at Llanbadarn Fawr near Aberystwyth where it appears that he took refuge when St David's was at times exposed to Viking incursions. Llanbadarn enjoyed a reputation for scholarship. One of his sons, Rhigyfarch was the author of a 'Life of Saint David'.

References
Evans, D. Simon (1959). Buched Dewi.
Williams (ab Ithel), John, ed. (1860), Annales Cambriae (444 – 1288), London: Longman, Green, Longman, and Roberts

1090s deaths
Bishops of St Davids
People from Ceredigion
Welsh scholars and academics
11th-century English Roman Catholic bishops
Year of birth unknown